Keith Ian Carradine (born August 8, 1949) is an American actor who has had success on stage, film, and television. He is known for his roles as Tom Frank in Robert Altman's film Nashville, Wild Bill Hickok in the HBO series Deadwood, FBI agent Frank Lundy in Dexter, Lou Solverson in the first season of Fargo, and US president Conrad Dalton in Madam Secretary. He also had a recurring role as Penny's father Wyatt in the CBS Sitcom The Big Bang Theory. As a member of the Carradine family, he is part of an acting dynasty that began with his father, John Carradine.

Early life
Carradine was born in San Mateo, California. He is the son of actress and artist Sonia Sorel (née Henius), and actor John Carradine. His full brothers are Christopher and Robert Carradine, both of whom are actors.  His paternal half-brothers are Bruce and David Carradine. His maternal half-brother is Michael Bowen. His maternal great-grandfather was biochemist Max Henius, and his maternal great-grandmother was the sister of historian Johan Ludvig Heiberg.

Carradine's childhood was troubled; he has said that his father drank and his mother "was a manic depressive paranoid schizophrenic catatonic—she had it all." His parents were divorced in 1957, when he was eight years old. A bitter custody battle led to his father gaining custody of him and his brothers, Christopher and Robert, after the children had spent three months in a home for abused children as wards of the court. Keith said of the experience, "It was like being in jail. There were bars on the windows, and we were only allowed to see our parents through glass doors. It was very sad. We would stand there on either side of the glass door crying." He was raised in San Mateo primarily by his maternal grandmother, and he rarely saw either of his parents. His mother was not permitted to see him for eight years following the custody settlement.

Carradine attended the Ojai Valley School, where he was active in the school's theater department, performing in productions of Aria da Capo and The Madwoman of Chaillot. After high school, Carradine entertained the thought of becoming a forest ranger, and enrolled at Colorado State University in Fort Collins. "I had this idyllic fantasy of sitting somewhere communing with nature and chatting with the bears," he recalled, "[but] I didn't want to have to learn anything." He changed his major to drama after enrolling, but dropped out after one semester and returned to California, moving in with his older half-brother, David, who encouraged him to pursue an acting career, paid for his acting and vocal lessons, and helped him get an agent.

Career

Stage
As a youth, Carradine had opportunities to appear on stage with his father in the latter's productions of Shakespeare. Thus, he had some background in theater when he was cast in the original Broadway run of Hair (1969), which launched his acting career. In that production he started out in the chorus and worked his way up to the lead roles playing Woof and Claude. He said of his involvement in Hair, "I really didn't plan to audition. I just went along with my brother, David, and his girlfriend at the time, Barbara Hershey, and two of their friends. I was simply going to play the piano for them while they sang, but I'm the one the staff wound up getting interested in."

His stage career is further distinguished by his Tony-nominated performance for Best Actor (Musical) as the title character in the Tony Award-winning musical, The Will Rogers Follies in 1991, for which he also received a Drama Desk Award nomination. He won the Outer Critics Circle Award for Foxfire with Hume Cronyn and Jessica Tandy, and appeared as Lawrence in Dirty Rotten Scoundrels at the Imperial Theater. In 2008, he appeared as Dr. Farquhar Off-Broadway in Mindgame, a thriller by Antony Horowitz, directed by Ken Russell, who made his New York directorial debut with the production. In March and April 2013, he starred in the Broadway production of Hands on a Hardbody. He was nominated for the Tony Award and the Drama Desk Award for his work.

Film

Carradine's first notable film appearance was in director Robert Altman's McCabe & Mrs. Miller (1971). His next film, Emperor of the North Pole (1973), was re-released with a shorter title Emperor of the North. Carradine played a young aspiring hobo. The film was directed by Robert Aldrich and also starred Lee Marvin and Ernest Borgnine. Carradine then starred in Altman's film Thieves Like Us (1974), then played a principal character, a callow, womanizing folk singer, Tom Frank, in Altman's critically acclaimed film Nashville (1975; see "Music and songwriting"). He had difficulty shaking the image of Tom Frank following the popularity of the film. He felt the role gave him the reputation of being "a cad."

In 1977 Aldrich said "I think that Keith Carradine, if he's careful—I don't think he is careful—and if he's prudent about the selection of his parts, can be a great big movie star. I think that whoever's advising him is making some terrible selections about material. Because I think the guy is gifted, he's talented, he's attractive."

In 1977, Carradine starred opposite Harvey Keitel in Ridley Scott's The Duellists. Pretty Baby followed in 1978. He has acted in several offbeat films of Altman's protege Alan Rudolph, playing a disarmingly candid madman in Choose Me (1984), an incompetent petty criminal in Trouble in Mind (1985), and an American artist in 1930s Paris in The Moderns (1988).

He appeared with brothers David and Robert as the Younger brothers in Walter Hill's film The Long Riders (1980). Keith played Jim Younger in that film. In 1981, he appeared again under Hill's direction in Southern Comfort. In 1994, he had a cameo role as Will Rogers in Rudolph's film about Dorothy Parker, Mrs. Parker and the Vicious Circle. He co-starred with Daryl Hannah as homicidal sociopath John Netherwood in the thriller The Tie That Binds (1995). In 2011, he starred in Cowboys and Aliens, an American science fiction western film directed by Jon Favreau also starring Daniel Craig, Harrison Ford, and Olivia Wilde. Carradine traveled to Tuscany in 2012 to executive produce and star in John Jopson's Edgar Allan Poe inspired film Terroir. In 2013, he starred in Ain't Them Bodies Saints, which won the 2013 Sundance Film Festival award for cinematography. In 2016 Keith played Edward Dickinson, father of Emily Dickinson, in A Quiet Passion, a biographical film directed and written by Terence Davies about the life of the American poet.

In 2016 Carradine returned to star in his fourth Alan Rudolph film Ray Meets Helen, which was the final screen appearance of Sondra Locke.

Music and songwriting
His brother, David, said in an interview that Keith could play any instrument he wanted, including bagpipes and the French horn. Like David, Keith integrated his musical talents with his acting performances. In 1975, he performed a song he had written, "I'm Easy", in the movie Nashville. It was a popular hit, and Carradine won a Golden Globe and an Oscar for Best Original Song for the tune. This led to a brief singing career; he signed a contract with Asylum Records and released two albums – I'm Easy (1976) and Lost & Found (1978). His song "Mr. Blue" was number 44 in the Canadian AC charts in April 1978. In 1984, he appeared in the music video for Madonna's single "Material Girl". In the early 1990s, he played the lead role in the Tony Award-winning musical The Will Rogers Follies.

Television
In 1972, Carradine appeared briefly in the first season of the hit television series, Kung Fu, which starred his brother, David. Keith played a younger version of David's character, Kwai Chang Caine. In 1987, he starred in the highly rated CBS miniseries Murder Ordained with JoBeth Williams and Kathy Bates. Other TV appearances include My Father My Son (1988), a television film. In 1983, he appeared as Foxy Funderburke, a murderous pedophile, in the television miniseries Chiefs, based on the Stuart Woods novel of the same name. His performance in Chiefs earned him a nomination for an Emmy Award in the "Outstanding Supporting Actor in a Limited Series or a Special" category. Carradine also starred in the ABC sitcom Complete Savages, and he played Wild Bill Hickok in the HBO series Deadwood.

Carradine hosted the documentary Wild West Tech series on the History Channel in the 2003–2004 season, before handing the job over to his brother, David. In the 2005 miniseries Into the West, produced by Steven Spielberg and DreamWorks, Carradine played Richard Henry Pratt. During the second and fourth seasons of the Showtime series Dexter, he appeared numerous times as FBI Special Agent Frank Lundy.  Carradine is credited with guest starring twice on the suspense-drama Criminal Minds, as the psychopathic serial killer Frank Breitkopf. Other shows he appeared in include The Big Bang Theory (as Penny's father Wyatt), Star Trek: Enterprise ("First Flight" episode) and the Starz series Crash. Carradine also made a guest appearance on NCIS in 2014. Also in 2014, he had a recurring role as Lou Solverson in the FX series Fargo, followed by a recurring role as President Conrad Dalton on Madam Secretary. He was promoted to series regular starting with the show's second season.

In July 2016, Carradine hosted a month-long series of Western films on Turner Classic Movies. He appeared in dozens of wraparounds on the channel, discussing such films as Stagecoach, featuring his father, and McCabe and Mrs. Miller, in which he himself appears in a small role.

Video games
In 2012, Carradine lent his voice to the video game Hitman: Absolution, voicing the primary antagonist Blake Dexter.

Personal life
Carradine met actress Shelley Plimpton in the Broadway musical Hair. She was married to actor Steve Curry, although they were separated; she and Carradine became romantically involved. After Carradine left the show and was in California he learned that Shelley was pregnant and had reunited with Curry. He met his daughter, Martha Plimpton, when she was four years old, after Shelley and Steve Curry had divorced. He said of Shelley, "She did a hell of a job raising Martha. I was not there. I was a very young man, absolutely terrified. She just took that in, and then she welcomed me into Martha's life when I was ready."

Carradine married Sandra Will on February 6, 1982. They were separated in 1993, before Will filed for divorce in 1999. The couple had two children: Cade Richmond Carradine (born July 19, 1982) and Sorel Johannah Carradine (born June 18, 1985). In 2006, Will pleaded guilty to two counts of perjury for lying to a grand jury about her involvement in the Anthony Pellicano wire tap scandal. She hired and then became romantically involved with Pellicano after her divorce from Carradine. According to FBI documents, Pellicano tapped Carradine's telephone and recorded calls between him and girlfriend Hayley Leslie DuMond at Will's request, along with DuMond's parents. Carradine filed a civil lawsuit against Will and Pellicano which was settled in 2013 before it went to trial.

On November 18, 2006, Carradine married actress Hayley DuMond, in Turin, Italy. They met in 1997 when they co-starred in the Burt Reynolds film The Hunter's Moon.

Filmography

Film

Television

Video games

Awards and nominations

See also
Carradine family
List of 1970s one-hit wonders in the United States

References

Further reading
Pilato, Herbie J. The Kung Fu Book of Caine: The Complete Guide to TV's First Mystical Eastern Western.  Boston: Charles A. Tuttle, 1993.

External links

Official site Mindgame
BroadwayWorld.com interview with Keith Carradine, October 16, 2008
Keith Carradine Discusses 'The Duellists' at Virginia Film Festival, November 3, 2012
SAG-AFTRA Foundation Conversations with Keith Carradine, May 17, 2013

American male film actors
American male musical theatre actors
American male stage actors
American male television actors
American male video game actors
American male voice actors
American people of Danish descent
1949 births
Living people
Carradine family
Male actors from California
Best Original Song Academy Award-winning songwriters
Golden Globe Award-winning musicians
Male actors from the San Francisco Bay Area
People from Topanga, California
20th-century American male actors
21st-century American male actors
Audiobook narrators